Dragoș Dima was the defending champion but lost in the first round to Václav Šafránek.

Danilo Petrović won the title after defeating Christopher O'Connell 6–4, 6–2 in the final.

Seeds
All seeds receive a bye into the second round.

Draw

Finals

Top half

Section 1

Section 2

Bottom half

Section 3

Section 4

References

External links
Main draw
Qualifying draw

2019 ATP Challenger Tour
2019 Singles